Franck Lambert (born September 10, 1960) is a French sprint canoer who competed in the early 1980s. At the 1980 Summer Olympics in Moscow, he finished ninth in the C-2 500 m event while withdrawing prior to the heats of the C-1 500 m event.

References

1960 births
Canoeists at the 1980 Summer Olympics
French male canoeists
Living people
Olympic canoeists of France